Grew Up On That is the third extended play by Canadian country music group High Valley. It was released on May 8, 2020 through Warner Nashville. It includes the singles "Grew Up On That" and "River's Still Running".

Track listing

Charts

Singles

Release history

References

2020 EPs
High Valley EPs
Warner Music Group EPs